Underachievers Please Try Harder is the second LP from the indie band Camera Obscura, released in 2003. The album was released in Australia by Popfrenzy.

Reception

Writing for AllMusic, critic Tim Sendra praised the album, again comparing the group to Belle and Sebastian and writing that "the band manages the rare feat of sounding full and rich without jamming every possible frequency with sound. It also throws in loads of imaginative little hooks that keep things lively". Scott Plagenhoef of Pitchfork wrote "Their honest, wide, and adult approach to heartbreak, romantic liaisons, and escapism is extended to the subtle range of influence — most of which is shown off on the tracks sung by John Henderson".

Track listing

US edition bonus tracks
 "I Don't Want to See You"
 "Footloose and Fancy Free"

Australian edition bonus tracks
 "San Francisco Song"
 "Amigo Mio"

Japanese edition bonus tracks
 "I Don't Want to See You"
 "Footloose and Fancy Free"
 "SF Song"
 "Amigo Mio"

Personnel
Tracyanne Campbell – vocals, guitar
Carey Lander – organ, piano, vocals
Kenny McKeeve – vocals, guitar, harmonica, mandolin
John Henderson – vocals, percussion
Gavin Dunbar – bass
Lee Thomson – drums
Nigel Baillie – trumpet
Geoff Allan – percussion, Stylophone
Production notes:
Camera Obscura – producer
Geoff Allan – producer, engineer
Frank Arkwright – mastering
Stuart Murdoch – photography

References

2003 albums
Camera Obscura (band) albums